The six-banded tiger barb (Desmopuntius hexazona) is a Southeast Asian species of cyprinid fish native to blackwater streams, peat swamps and other freshwater habitats with little movement in the Malay Peninsula, Sumatra and Borneo. Although there are reports from the Mekong basin, this is generally consider to be outside the range of the genus Desmopuntius. D. hexazona has often been confused—especially in the aquarium trade—with the less widespread, closely related D. pentazona, which is similar except that it has a black spot at the rear base of its dorsal fin (something that D. hexazona lacks). Although overall relatively widespread, D. hexazona is considered threatened in Singapore.

References 

Desmopuntius
Fish of Thailand
Fish described in 1912